Patrik Danek (born 2 October 2001) is a Slovak footballer who plays for FC Petržalka as a winger.

Club career
Danek made his professional Fortuna Liga debut for Nitra against Spartak Trnava during a home 1:0 victory at pod Zoborom on 2 November 2019. He came on after 87 minutes of play to replace Samuel Šefčík, with the final score already set by Milan Ristovski earlier in the first half.

References

External links
 FC Nitra official club profile 
 Futbalnet profile 
 
 

2001 births
Living people
Sportspeople from Trnava
Slovak footballers
Slovakia youth international footballers
Association football midfielders
FC Nitra players
FC Petržalka players
Slovak Super Liga players